"I'm So Blue" is a song by American recording artist Michael Jackson. The song was originally recorded in 1987 during initial recording sessions for Jackson's seventh studio album, Bad, but was never finished and was left off the album. The song was later included on Bad 25, a twenty-fifth anniversary re-release of the Bad album.

Lyrics
The lyrics of the song describes a lover who discusses his former love and feeling that it gives him when reflecting on the relationship.

Release
"I'm So Blue" was released on October 1, 2012 on the Italian radio stations, and was also released to some Polish stations in December that year.

References

1987 songs
2012 singles
Michael Jackson songs
Songs written by Michael Jackson